Robert Eyton may refer to:

 Robert William Eyton (1815–1881), English clergyman and author
 Robert Eyton (priest, died 1751), Anglican priest, Archdeacon of Ely
 Robert Eyton (priest, died 1908), Anglican priest, Rector of St Margaret's, Westminster
 Robert Eyton (MP), Member of Parliament (MP) for Much Wenlock